Cauchy is a small lunar impact crater on the eastern Mare Tranquillitatis. It was named after French mathematician Augustin-Louis Cauchy. It is circular and symmetric, with a small interior floor at the midpoint of the sloping inner walls. Due to the high albedo of this bowl-shaped formation, it is particularly prominent at full Moon.

Cauchy lies between the Rupes Cauchy and the Rimae Cauchy, as described below.

South of Rupes Cauchy are two lunar domes designated Omega (ω) Cauchy and Tau (τ) Cauchy. They lie to the south and southwest of Cauchy respectively. Each lunar dome has a small depression at its crest, which is likely to be a volcanic vent rather than an impact crater.  The vent at the top of Omega Cauchy is called Donna.

Rupes Cauchy

To the south of Cauchy is a 120-km fault in the surface named the Rupes Cauchy, which forms a series of cliffs or escarpments. This wall roughly parallels the Rima Cauchy to the north.

Rima Cauchy
To the north of Cauchy is the rille named Rima Cauchy, a 210-kilometer-long graben.

Satellite craters
By convention these features are identified on lunar maps by placing the letter on the side of the crater midpoint that is closest to Cauchy.

Cauchy A is shown as Hussein on a 1974 map based on Apollo 15 photographs, but the name was not approved by the IAU, which officially designated the crater name in 2006.

References

External links

 LTO-61A3 Cauchy — L&PI topographic map

Augustin-Louis Cauchy
Impact craters on the Moon